The 1958–59 Spartan League season was the 41st in the history of Spartan League. The league consisted of 16 teams.

League table

The division featured 16 teams, 14 from last season and 2 new teams:
 Staines Town, from Hellenic League
 Ruislip Manor, from London League

After the season Briggs Sports merged with Ford Sports to form Ford United,
and joined Aetolian League.

References

1958-59
9